Sagar Mahavidyalaya, established in 1998, is an undergraduate college in Harinbari, Sagar, West Bengal, India. It is affiliated with the University of Calcutta.

Departments

Arts

Bengali
English
History
Geography
Political Science
Philosophy
Education

Accreditation
Sagar Mahavidyalaya is recognized by the University Grants Commission (UGC).

See also
 Sagar Institute of Research & Technology
List of colleges affiliated to the University of Calcutta
Education in India
Education in West Bengal

References

External links
Sagar Mahavidyalaya

Educational institutions established in 1998
University of Calcutta affiliates
Universities and colleges in South 24 Parganas district
1998 establishments in West Bengal